The 2012–13 Volga season was the 2nd season that the club played in the Russian Premier League, the highest tier of football in Russia. They finished the season in 12th place and were eliminated from the Russian Cup at the Round of 32 stage by Russian National Football League side FC Khimki.
Manager Dmitri Cheryshev was sacked during pre-season and was replaced by Gadzhi Gadzhiev on 7 June 2012
Gadzhiev then resigned on 19 January 2013 and was replaced by Yuriy Kalitvintsev.

Squad

Transfers

Summer

In:

Out:

Winter

In:

Out:

Competitions

Friendlies

Russian Premier League

Matches

Table

Russian Cup

Squad statistics

Appearances and goals

|-
|colspan="14"|Players away from the club on loan:
|-
|colspan="14"|Players who appeared for Volga Nizhny Novgorod who left the club:

|}

Top scorers

Disciplinary record

References

FC Volga Nizhny Novgorod seasons
Volga Nizhny Novgorod